Einmal Prinz zu sein is a German comedy television series. The film was directed by Sven Unterwaldt and Micha Terjung.

See also

List of German television series

External links
 

2001 German television series debuts
2001 German television series endings
German comedy television series
German-language television shows
Television shows set in Cologne
Das Erste original programming